The 2017 World Table Tennis Championships were held in Düsseldorf, Germany, from 29 May to 5 June 2017. The decision to host the event in Düsseldorf was announced by the ITTF in April 2015. They were the 54th edition of the competition, and the seventh time that it has been staged in Germany.

Schedule
Five events were contested, with qualification rounds taking place from 29 to 30 May.

Medal summary

Medal table

Events

See also
2017 ITTF Men's World Cup
2017 ITTF Women's World Cup
2017 ITTF World Tour
2017 ITTF World Tour Grand Finals

References

External links
Official website
ITTF website

 
World Table Tennis Championships
2017 in German sport
2017 in table tennis
Sports competitions in Düsseldorf
Table tennis competitions in Germany
International sports competitions hosted by Germany
May 2017 sports events in Germany
June 2017 sports events in Germany
2010s in Düsseldorf